Ek Haatko Taali is an essay collection written by Yubraj Nayaghare in 2009. It won the Madan Puraskar literary award in 2065 B.S. (2009).

References

External links
Goodreads

Nepali-language books
Nepalese essay collections
2009 non-fiction books
Madan Puraskar-winning works
21st-century Nepalese books